Thakrit Tawanpong (Thai: ฐกฤต ตวันพงค์) (born April 10, 1989), or better known as Phet Thakrit is ThaiLand's Channel 3 Television actor.

Career

2012–present 
Phet first starred in the movie, First Kiss with costar Kaneungnij Jaksamittanon (Rotmay) in 2012. He was then cast in the hit Lakorn, The Sixth Sense the same year with Kritsiri Suksawat. He was then reunited with the same casts for a second part of The Sixth Sense in 2013 and an evening lakorn, Chat Jao Paya with Michelle Behrmann.

Phet Thakrit debuted into the entertainment world through music videos, but he did not get majorly known until he starred in the movie Ruk Sood Tai Pai Nah (First Kiss), in which he starred alongside Rotmay Kaneungnij. It is said that Rotmay picked him for the role herself, through casting. He is now signed with CH3 and was cast into the hit lakorn The Sixth Sense. -Aikoden.

He is best known for his lakorns, The Sixth Sense and Bang Rajun, and Krong Kam.

When Phet was a college student, he would often fall asleep during English class because he thought it was boring and did not like it. But now that he has grown up, his mind has changed. He wants to be able to communicate with his foreigner fans and understand them. He practices the language often and tries his best when speaking it. Though his English isn't the best, he's happy to understand his fans more. He thinks learning English is very important.

Phet describes himself as a good-nature guy. Smiles a lot and when angry, it's reasonable enough. Likes being surrounded with people not too serious. Family is super important to him which makes him quite sensitive when having family troubles. He is especially close with his father as he is always seen around him and takes him to almost everywhere he goes.

Filmography

Movie

Television series

References

2. Thai Wiki

External links
 

1989 births
Living people
Thakrit Tawanpong
Thakrit Tawanpong
Thakrit Tawanpong